The Tawrat, also romanized as Tawrah or Taurat, is the Arabic-language name for the Torah within its context as an Islamic holy book believed by Muslims to have been given by God to the prophets and messengers amongst the Children of Israel. When referring to traditions from the Tawrat, Muslims have not only identified it with the Pentateuch, but also with the other books of the Hebrew Bible as well as with Talmudic and Midrashim writings.

In the Quran

The word Tawrat occurs eighteen times in the Quran and the name of Musa is mentioned 136 times in the Quran; nowhere in the Quran is it written that Moses alone has been given the Tawrat, but on the contrary it is written in the Quran that the prophets governed with the Tawrat.
As per Quran, the governing ayats containing an order of God is the Tawrat.
The Law mentioned in the Quran (5:45):

Similarly it is mentioned in  Exodus:

According to 7:157, Muhammad is written about in both the Injil (Gospel), revelations to Jesus (Isa) and the Tawrat,

The Tawrat is mentioned as being known by Isa in 5:110.

Some quotations are repeated from other books of the Hebrew Bible. An example of this is 48:29,

This could be repeated from Psalms:

The Torah is also described as a work that supported the Qur'an, and a guide from Allah.

In the hadith
Muhammad referenced the Torah heavily. He did say that Moses was one of the few prophets to receive a revelation directly from God, that is, without an intervening angel. On one occasion, it is recorded that some Jews wanted Muhammad to decide how to deal with their brethren who had committed adultery. Abu Dawood recorded:

Semantics

There is some ambiguity among English-speaking Muslims on the use of Tawrat versus Torah. The Arabic of the Quran and hadith have only one word, Tawrat. Generally, in English, they are used interchangeably. However, some Muslims prefer to reserve Tawrat to refer only to the original revelation of God to Moses which some Muslims believe was later corrupted, possibly through the Babylonian captivity, and the rewriting of Ezra (Uzair) (and the men of the Great Assembly). However it is not possible to state without any authentic sources as to where, when, and by whom the Torah was changed. Since the Quran mentions Uzair by name in chapter 9 verse 30, and does not say that he corrupted the Torah in this verse, it cannot be said that Uzair did so.

Importance of the Torah
The word Torah occurs eighteen times and the name of Moses is mentioned 136 times in the Quran. Nowhere in the Quran is it written that Moses alone taught by the Torah as all succeeding Hebrew prophets and seers, including Harun, used the Law for preaching. The Quran states that the Torah did have words of wisdom in it, and all subsequent prophets, priest, rabbis and sages in Israel used its Law for guidance for prophets in plural and not only for Moses alone.

The Quran mentions that the basic aspects of Islamic law are evident in the earliest scriptures, including that of Moses. He mentions that it contains the information about the Last Day and about the concepts of Paradise (Jannah) and Hell (Jahannam). The Torah is also mentioned as being known by Jesus.

See also
 Scrolls of Abraham

References

External links
A discussion of the Tawrat and some other scriptures
Does Quran confirm the Jewish Scripts?
Study Regarding the Tawrat 

Islamic texts
Torah